Louis Heinrick Giele, AIA (1861–1932) was a German-born American architect, who designed a number of Catholic churches, schools, convents and rectories in New York, New Jersey, Pennsylvania, Massachusetts, and elsewhere.

Personal life
Giele was born "Ludwig Heinrich Giele" in Hanover and emigrated to the United States in January 1882 as a carpenter. He married Linda Holder in July 1884 in Jersey City and set up an architectural practice there.

Architectural practice

Although Giele was not an especially prolific architect, the buildings he designed were very well appreciated and at least two of them are listed on the National Register of Historic Places.

Works include
 St Charles Borromeo Church, Brooklyn, New York
 St. Josephat School, Philadelphia, Pennsylvania
 St. John the Baptist Church, Allentown, Pennsylvania
 St. Casimir Church, Yonkers, New York
 Sacred Heart Hospital, Allentown, Pennsylvania
 St. Augustine Church, Bronx, New York
 St. Anne Church, Jersey City, NJ
 St. Anthony of Padua Church, Jersey City, New Jersey
 Sisters of Peace building, Jersey City, New Jersey
 Our Lady of Perpetual Help Church,  New Bedford, Massachusetts
 St. John Cantius Church, Philadelphia, Pennsylvania
 St. Adalbert Church, Philadelphia, Pennsylvania
 St. Adalbert School, Philadelphia, Pennsylvania
 Assisium Institute, New York, New York
 Christ Temple of the Apostolic Faith, Harlem, New York

References

1861 births
1932 deaths
American ecclesiastical architects
Architects from Hanover
Architects from New Jersey
Architects of Roman Catholic churches
German emigrants to the United States
People from Jersey City, New Jersey